Sandford Lyne (March 27, 1945 – February 7, 2007) was an American poet, educator, and editor.

Edited Publications 

Soft Hay Will Catch You: Poems by Young People (Simon & Schuster, 2004)
Ten second Rainshowers: Poems by Young People (Simon & Schuster, 1996)

Books on Writing 

Writing Poetry from the Inside Out (Sourcebooks, 2007)

Poetry collections 
In The Footsteps of Paradise (Loch Raven Press, 2008)

References

External links 
 Ploughshares Publication Entry
 Loch Raven Review Retrospective, including poems, letters, and essays

American male poets
Iowa Writers' Workshop alumni
2007 deaths
1945 births
20th-century American poets
20th-century American male writers